Mario Ančić and Mahesh Bhupathi were the defending champions, but Ančić chose not to participate, and only Bhupathi competed that year. 
Bhupathi partnered with Fabrice Santoro, but withdrew.

Robert Lindstedt and Jarkko Nieminen won in the final 7–6(7–3), 7–6(7–5), against Rohan Bopanna and Aisam-ul-Haq Qureshi.

Seeds

  Mahesh Bhupathi /  Fabrice Santoro (withdrew)
  František Čermák /  Leoš Friedl (first round)
  Robert Lindstedt /  Jarkko Nieminen (champions)
  Yves Allegro /  Kristof Vliegen (quarterfinals)

Draw

Draw

External links
Draw

Doubles